James E. Bailey was a United States Army Sergeant during the Indian Wars who received the Medal of Honor on April 12, 1875, for service during the winter of 1872–73.

Medal of Honor citation
Citation:
Gallant conduct during campaigns and engagements with Apaches.

See also

 List of Medal of Honor recipients

References

Year of birth missing
Year of death missing
People from Dexter, Maine
United States Army non-commissioned officers
American military personnel of the Indian Wars
United States Army Medal of Honor recipients
American Indian Wars recipients of the Medal of Honor
19th-century American people